Fidgetin-like 2 (FL2) is a human enzyme that slows the rate at which skin cells migrate to wounds to heal them. If this enzyme is suppressed/absent, skin cells move faster, speeding the healing process.

Delivery 

Molecules of silencing RNA (siRNA) that bind to a gene's messenger RNA (mRNA) can inhibit the production of FL2, but siRNAs require protection from degradation in order to reach a wound site.

In 2015, researchers disclosed the successful use of nanoparticles to ferry siRNA molecules to their intended targets, reducing healing times in mice with skin excisions or burns. The result was normal, well-orchestrated tissue, including hair follicles and supportive collagen network.

References

External links 
 NCBI 401720
 Uniprot A6NMB9
 Mouse gene informatics: 3646919

Nanotechnology
Enzymes